Víctor Hugo Hernández  (born 19 May 1986 in Zamora, Michoacán, Mexico) is a Mexican former professional footballer who last played as a goalkeeper for Atlético Zacatepec.

References

1986 births
Living people
People from Zamora, Michoacán
Footballers from Michoacán
Mexican footballers
C.D. Guadalajara footballers
Liga MX players
Association football goalkeepers
Club Puebla players